The 1965–66 Czechoslovak Extraliga season was the 23rd season of the Czechoslovak Extraliga, the top level of ice hockey in Czechoslovakia. 10 teams participated in the league, and ZKL Brno won the championship.

Standings

1. Liga-Qualification

External links
History of Czechoslovak ice hockey

Czechoslovak Extraliga seasons
Czechoslovak
1965 in Czechoslovak sport
1966 in Czechoslovak sport